Pagetoid is a term used in dermatology to refer to "upward spreading" of abnormal cells in the epidermis (ie from bottom to top). It is uncommon and a possible indication of a precancerous or cancerous condition. Cells display pagetoid growth when they invade the upper epidermis from below. Squamous cell carcinoma, melanoma in situ, Pagetoid Bowen's disease, ocular sebaceous carcinoma, and other carcinomas can all display pagetoid growth.

The term pagetoid (i.e., 'Paget-like') is derived from the extramammary Paget's disease, wherein the large tumour cells are arranged singly or in small clusters within the epidermis and its appendages. These cells are distinguished by a clear halo from the surrounding epithelial cells and a finely granular cytoplasm. This proliferation of cells in the epidermis is responsible for the "buckshot scatter" pattern. This is a typical feature of superficial spreading type of melanoma.

References 

Dermatologic terminology
Oncology